The Academy Award for Best Story was an Academy Award given from the beginning of the Academy Awards until 1956. This award can be a source of confusion for modern audiences, given its co-existence with the Academy Award for Best Adapted Screenplay and Academy Award for Best Original Screenplay. The Oscar for Best Story most closely resembles the usage of modern film treatments, or prose documents that describe the entire plot and characters, but typically lack most dialogue. A separate screenwriter would convert the story into a full screenplay.

As an example, at the 1944 Academy Awards, producer and director Leo McCarey won Best Story for Going My Way while screenwriters Frank Butler and Frank Cavett won Best Screenplay. The elimination of this category in 1956 reflects the decline of Hollywood's studio system and the emergence of independent screenwriters.

Winners and nominees

1920s

1930s

1940s

1950s

Notes

References

Story
 
Articles containing video clips